Nembrotha livingstonei is a species of colourful sea slug, a dorid nudibranch, a marine gastropod mollusk in the family Polyceridae. It was first described in 1933.

Distribution
This species is known from the tropical Indo-Pacific Ocean.

Description
Nembrotha livingstonei is a red-brown nembrothid that grows to at least 48 mm in length. The body is marked with white, orange and brown spots. The rhinophores are reddy-brown. The gill stalks and branches are white or yellow, while the gill pinnae are deep red.

Ecology
Nembrotha livingstonei eats colonial ascidians.

References

External links
 Nembrotha livingstonei at nudipixel

Polyceridae
Gastropods described in 1933